Rhapontigenin is a stilbenoid. It can be isolated from Vitis coignetiae or from Gnetum cleistostachyum.

It shows an action on prostate cancer cells. It has been shown to inhibit the human cytochrome P450 1A1, an enzyme implicated in the biotransformation of a number of carcinogenic and immunotoxic compounds.

Injected in rats, rhapontigenin shows a rapid glucuronidation and a poor bioavailability.

See also
Rhaponticin, its glucoside, found in rhubarb.
Isorhapontigenin, a structural isomer.

References

External links

Stilbenoids
Cytochrome P450 inhibitors